Everhour is a team-oriented time tracking software product that was launched in 2015 by Weavora Consulting LLC, a web development company from Minsk, Belarus.

Properties
Everhour has the following properties:
 Chrome extension
 Time tracking
 Integration and synchronization with many kinds of business tools such as: Asana, Basecamp, GitHub, Trello, BitBucket, FreshBooks, Jira, Insightly, Pivotal Tracker, QuickBooks, Slack, Teamwork Projects and Xero
 Accounting
 Responsive interface

See also
 Comparison of time tracking software

References

Time-tracking software